Zelogamasus is a genus of mites in the family Parasitidae.

Species
 Zelogamasus oligochaetus M. K. Hennessey & M. H. Farrier, 1989

References

Parasitidae